Strongback may refer to:

 Strongback (girder), a beam or girder which acts as a secondary support member to existing structure
 Strongback, the band formed by two former members of Palladium (British band) in 2009
 Strongback, any one of at least three Caribbean herbs, Morinda royoc, Desmodium abscendens, and Cuphea parsonsia
 Strongback, the Java libraries and framework introduced by FIRST Robotics team 4931